Exostosin-like 1 is a protein that in humans is encoded by the EXTL1 gene.

This gene is a member of the multiple exostoses (EXT) family of glycosyltransferases, which function in the chain polymerization of heparan sulfate and heparin. The encoded protein harbors alpha 1,4- N-acetylglucosaminyltransferase activity, and is involved in chain elongation of heparan sulfate and possibly heparin.

References

Further reading